Barbara Barg (April 29, 1947 — May 22, 2018) was a poet, writer, and musician.

Barg was born in Memphis, Tennessee and raised in Forrest City, Arkansas. After studying with poet Ted Berrigan at Northeastern Illinois University in Chicago, she moved to New York City and became involved in a number of individual and collaborative projects on the downtown poetry/music scene in the late 1970s-1990s. She performed frequently at venues like The Kitchen, Bowery Ballroom, St Mark's Poetry Project, Bowery Poetry Club, Nuyorican Poets Café, Fez, CBGB, Luna Lounge, Sidewalk Cafe's The Fort, Mercury Lounge, Galapogos, The Sculpture Center, The Open Center, as well as One World Poetry Festival (Amsterdam) and The International Festival of the Poets (Rome). With writer Maggie Dubris she co-founded the all-women cult band "Homer Erotic" (1991 to 2000), which came to life during a  lull in poetry readings in the early 90s. The group was composed of seven women interested in music and poetry as performative art forms. She has also performed with Pauline Oliveros, Elliott Sharp, Z'EV, Janene Higgins, Monique Buzzarté and other experimental artists and musicians. Her poetry is attuned to notions of poetic ethnologies, and what she called "voluntary evolution" ("evolution for the hell of it") and "whatever other notion I get in my head".  Barg most recently lived in Chicago, and was on faculty at The Chicago School of Poetics, and was writing screenplays for Jump Room Films.

Death
On May 22, 2018, Ellen Floren's official Facebook page revealed in a post that Barg had died. She was 71.

Books
 The Origin of THE Species, photograph by Robert Mapplethorpe ( Semiotext(e) )
 Obeying the Chemicals with photographs by Nan Goldin  (Hard Press)

Recordings
 Yield (with the band Homer Erotic, 1998 - Creme de la Femme)
 Homerica the Beautiful (with the band Homer Erotic, 1999 - Bobby Previte's Depth of Field label)
 Calling You Home (with the band Coyote Poets of the Universe, 2008 - Square Shaped Records)
 Holding Patterns (with the band Zanana, 2005 - Deep Listening )

Literary Anthologies
Barg's works have appeared in the following literary anthologies.
 American Poets Say Goodbye to the 20th Century (Four Walls Eight Windows)
 Poems for the Nation: A Collection of Contemporary Political Poems (Seven Stories Press)   Edited by Allen Ginsberg, Andy Clausen and Eliot Katz
 AM LIT: Neue Literatur Aus Den USA (Edition Druckhaus / Germany) Edited by Gerard Falkner and Sylvere Lotringer
 Out of This World: The Poetry Project at St. Mark's Church in-the-Bowery; 1966-1991 (Crown Publisher, Inc). Edited by Anne Waldman (with foreword by Allen Ginsberg)
 The L=A=N=G=U=A=G=E Book (Southern Illinois University Press) Edited by Charles Bernstein and Bruce Andrews

Audio Anthologies
Barg has contributed to numerous sound art anthologies, including Elliott Sharp's multi-artist compilation CDs State of the Union, Beneath the Valley of the Yahoos, Phone Noir (with Fem Noir), Late 20th Century Sexual Practices, One World Poetry (a multi-artist compilation recorded at Amsterdam's One World Poetry Festival), and Sugar Alcohol & Meat (produced by John Giorno Poetry Systems). Barg's audio work features in three multi-artist compilation cassette tapes: Noise Fest (with the band Avant Squares), and twice on Tellus Audio Cassette Magazine (in #1 and #5) (both with Barbara Ess).

References

External links
 Barbara Barg official site
 The Poetry Project at St. Mark’s Church in-the-Bowery
 The Allen Ginsberg Project
 The New York Times article The Patient Wants to Leave. The Hospital Says 'No Way.'
 Jump Room Films official site

Poets from Arkansas
20th-century American women writers
Writers from Little Rock, Arkansas
Northeastern Illinois University alumni
Musicians from Little Rock, Arkansas
1947 births
Living people
Musicians from Memphis, Tennessee
Musicians from New York City
American women poets
20th-century American poets
21st-century American women